The Flower Carpet is a biennial event in Brussels in which volunteers from around Belgium convene at the Grand-Place/Grote Markt, the historic centre of the city, to weave a carpet-like tapestry out of colourful begonias. The event takes place every other August, coordinating with Assumption Day. Nearly a million flowers are required to create the ephemeral  carpet.

History
The first Flower Carpet was created in 1971 by the Ghent landscape architect Etienne Stautemans in an effort to advertise his work, and due to its popularity, the tradition continued in subsequent years. The Tapis de Fleurs de Bruxelles Association was then created at the initiative of the City of Brussels in cooperation with the Province of Brabant and Les Franc-Bourgeois (a central Brussels traders’ association). The new association laid down the regulations; the event was to be held every two years, for three to four days on the weekend of 15 August and could be enhanced by sound and lighting, fireworks, a jazz concert and other traditional folk entertainments. 

Starting in 1986, the event has been regularly held biannually, each time under a different theme, with the Flower Carpet now attracting a large number of local and international visitors.

Description
The tapestry always exhibits tuberous begonias (Begonia tuberosa grandiflora), one of Belgium's major exports since 1860, and occasionally dahlias. More than a hundred volunteers are needed to set up, on a life-size drawing of the transparent and micro-perforated plastic mat, the decoration of grasses and bark where the flowers will be placed, produced on special order by horticulturists in the Ghent region in East Flanders.

Themes
Each year of the Flower Carpet, organisers select a theme for inspiration.
 In 2008, the patterns were inspired by 18th-century French designs and colours.
 In 2010, the carpet honoured Belgian Herman Van Rompuy, the first President of the European Council, with images of historic Belgian symbols alongside the European Union logo.
 In 2012, the carpet exhibited the colours of Africa, inspired by traditional fabrics and tribal costumes.
 In 2014, the carpet paid tribute to the 50th anniversary of Turkish immigrants by imitating the world-famous kilims. Turks came to Belgium in 1964 when both countries signed a bilateral treaty welcoming immigrants during the economic boom.
 In 2016, the carpet displayed a Japanese design to celebrate 150 years of friendship between Belgium and Japan.
 In 2018, the carpet featured cultural elements from the state of Guanajuato, Mexico, including symbolism from the Chupícuaro, Otomí and Purépecha cultures. In addition to the begonias, the carpet included dahlias, the national flower of Mexico.
 In 2020, the event was cancelled due to the COVID-19 pandemic in Belgium.
 In 2022, to mark the event's 50th anniversary and 22nd edition, the pattern was a nod to the first design from 1971. All the elements of this first design were present, including Saint Michael and the Leo Belgicus.

Gallery

2016

2018

See also

 Flower carpet
 History of Brussels
 Culture of Belgium

References

Notes

Culture in Brussels
History of Brussels
Tourist attractions in Brussels
City of Brussels
Summer events in Belgium